Tabassum Mansoor born in Gorakhpur, Uttar Pradesh holds a Bachelors of Education (B. Ed) from Aligarh Muslim University. Tabassum has been working for over 30 years in the field of primary education  and social welfare in Benghazi, Libya. She is the Managing Director and Principal of Indian International School, Benghazi.

In 2011, during the civil war against Col Gaddafi, the Indian Embassy in Tripoli handed her the responsibility to evacuate 3,000 stranded Indians from Benghazi and other parts of eastern Libya. Despite phone and internet services down, she mobilized her school buses all across the city and managed to assemble Indians from different parts of Libya in her school and transferred them from Benghazi, Libya to Egypt via a special ship. In 2014, she acted under extreme crisis and assisted the Mission in the repatriation of 289 desperate Indian citizens from Benghazi to Malta.

In 2020, she played an instrumental role in saving lives of seven Indian nationals who were abducted by Libyan Militants and managed their release through back channel diplomacy. Despite the ongoing crisis in Libya and closed borders all seven Indians were sent back on a special UN flight. Tabassum is a true daughter and flag bearer for India in spirit and service.

Early life 

Tabassum completed her education in Gorakhpur, Uttar Pradesh and then graduated from Aligarh Muslim University with a Bachelor of Education  She moved to Benghazi, Libya in 1980 and then set up the first Indian International School (IIS) there.

Career 

Tabassum has lived in Benghazi for over 30 years and has actively been promoting Indian culture and education in Libya. She is known for her work in promoting better understanding of Indian culture and education there. She introduced the CBSE Curriculum to Libya in 2002 and since then she has been the managing director and principal of the Indian International School, Benghazi. Tabassum was appointed as an honorary member of the Advisory Committee to restructure Primary Education and improve Teacher Training in Libya.

Tabassum also serves as the coordinator to the Embassy of India, Tripoli and Tunis for the Eastern Region of Libya. Since the Libyan turmoil, her patriotism manifested prominently through her selfless service- coordinating the welfare, evacuation and repatriation of over 3,000 Indians in 2011, 289 in 2014 and taking care of over 2,000 Indians during COVID-19 pandemic She is known for her work in promoting better understanding of Indian culture and education there.

In 2020, she successfully negotiated the high-profile kidnapping case of 7 Indians in Libya; and facilitated provision of food, medicines and repatriation of 27 desperate Indian workers through local and internartional resources in 2022

Awards 

In 2017, Tabassum was awarded the Uttar Pradesh Apravasi Bharatiya Ratan Puruskar for her efforts in primary education and social work in Libya. This is an accolade given to honour an ‘exceptional and meritorious contribution’ by a non-resident Indian of Uttar Pradesh origin

 Apravasi Bhartiya Ratna Samman by Govt. of U.P.
 Outstanding Women in Social Work by Ficci-Flo.
 Principal of the Year Award by Ministry of Education (Recognition for her long-standing commitment to education amid difficult circumstances came from the Libyan authorities when she was inducted as a member of the National Education Council of Libya).

References 

Indian women
Indian Muslims
Indian educators
People from Gorakhpur district
People from Uttar Pradesh
Living people
Year of birth missing (living people)